The Scottish Brewers Round-robin Tournament was a golf tournament that was played in Scotland from 1983 to 1985. It was played in a round-robin format

There were 9 competitors in each tournament who played each of the other 8 in an 18-hole match play contest. Matches were played as a three-ball with three players playing a match against one another, each player playing two distinct matches. Two points were awarded for each match won while halved matches earned one point. Players qualified via a number of criteria, including the Order of Merit, a qualifying event and a sponsor's invitation.

Winners

In 1985 Barnes took second place prize money on "countback".

References

Golf tournaments in Scotland
Recurring sporting events established in 1983
Recurring sporting events disestablished in 1985
1983 establishments in Scotland
1985 disestablishments in Scotland